Ask Forgiveness is a 2007 EP by Bonnie 'Prince' Billy. It is a collection of covers, with the exception of one original song by Oldham.

Track listing
 "I Came to Hear the Music" (Mickey Newbury)
 "I've Seen It All" (Björk, Sjón, Lars von Trier)
 "Am I Demon" (Glenn Danzig)
 "My Life" (Phil Ochs)
 "I'm Loving the Street" (Will Oldham)
 "The Way I Am" (Sonny Throckmorton)
 "Cycles" (Gayle Caldwell)
 "The World's Greatest" (R. Kelly)

Personnel
Meg Baird 
Greg Weeks
Maggie Wienk – cello

References

2007 albums
Will Oldham albums
Drag City (record label) EPs
Domino Recording Company EPs